Turkish Republican Party may refer to:
Republican Party (Turkey), a former political party in Turkey
Republican Turkish Party, a current-day political party in Cyprus

See also
Republican People's Party

Political party disambiguation pages